The Dalewool Auckland Brass Band was founded in 1919 as the Auckland Watersiders Silver Band. The band retained this title until the early 1950s when it became the Auckland Metropolitan Fire Brigade Band. The next name change occurred in the 1960s when it merged with the Onehunga Band to become the Waitemata Onehunga Silver Band.

The band reached A grade championship status in 1949 and achieved its first New Zealand Champion Band title in 1957.

Sponsorship by a local engineering firm saw the band's name change to Turrells Onehunga Brass Band, under which name they won the 1977 New Zealand Championships under the musical directorship of Errol Mason. Errol was arguably New Zealand's most famous cornetist and was certainly its most successful. He was victorious in the New Zealand Cornet Championship on 10 occasions and followed on to become New Zealand's Champion of Champions six times. He transferred this musical ability and search for performance excellence to the baton, where he led the band to numerous contest successes.

In 1979, the band obtained sponsorship from Continental Airlines, and as Continental Airlines Auckland Brass achieved international prominence throughout the 1980s . New Zealand Championship wins in 1980, 1983, 1986, 1989 and 1991 were added to the Australian title in 1983 and the world title in 1981.

1986 saw the completion of the new bandroom in Captain Springs Road in Onehunga, built on the site of the original bandroom. On the eve of the opening of the bandroom, Errol Mason died. His legacy lives on, however, in this building, which remains one of the leading rehearsal facilities in banding worldwide. This bandroom has also served to anchor down the Band as an Auckland and Onehunga identity.

When Continental Airlines ceased flying to New Zealand in 1994, sponsorship was moved to Carlton & United Breweries. As Fosters Auckland Brass, the Band won the New Zealand title in 1995 and 1996, and the Australian title in 1996 and 1997. The change to Dalewool Auckland Brass came as a result of Carlton & United Breweries ceasing sponsorships in New Zealand as the Band was fortunate enough to make the acquaintance of the McDermott family. The band, under its new name, has won the New Zealand Championships in 1998, the Australian Championships in 2001, and has released several CDs which have received critical acclaim both in New Zealand and overseas.

Dalewool Auckland Brass was the Champion Brass Band of New Zealand on more occasions than any other band during the 1990s, earning it the reputation as New Zealand's leading band of the decade.

In 2001 the Band launched its Subscription Concert Series with immediate success. Believed to be the first of its kind in the Southern Hemisphere for a brass band, the Subscription Concert Series is now an integral part of Auckland's musical calendar.

In recent history Dalewool Auckland Brass were crowned Champion Band of New Zealand in 2003 and 2004 and in 2005 won the prestigious "Band of the Year" title. In September 2004 the band travelled to the United Kingdom to compete in the prestigious British Open competition, placing in the top ten at the world's premier Brass Band Competition!

In 2007 Dalewool Auckland Brass was the top placed band at the New Zealand National Championships held on Auckland's North Shore and launched a new CD entitled Anthology. Following this success, Dalewool Brass entered the 2008 Australian Championships being held in Brisbane over Easter weekend.

In 2010 the band recorded the album Christmas Magic in collaboration with The Graduate Choir New Zealand.

Dalewool were crowned 2011 Scenic Hotel New Zealand Band of the Year for their entertainment programme under Howard Taylor.

External links

New Zealand musical groups
Brass bands